The 1906 Detroit College Tigers football team  was an American football team that represented Detroit College (renamed the University of Detroit in 1911) as an independent during the 1906 college football season. In its second season under head coach Edward J. Ryan , the team compiled a 4–2–1 record and outscored its opponents by a combined total of 52 to 21.

The football team had disbanded during the 1905 season.  In early October 1906, the college faculty decided upon further consideration to allow students to participate in sports, on the condition that the athletic association bear all expense.

Schedule

References

Detroit College Tigers
Detroit Titans football seasons
Detroit College Tigers football
Detroit College Tigers football